List of tallest buildings in Ipswich ranks the tallest buildings and structures within the English town of Ipswich, Suffolk. The list includes buildings which have since been demolished or are currently under construction. The tallest building in the town is the Cranfield Mill, which rises  and was topped out in 2009.

History

20th century
One of the first major 'building booms' was in the 1960s and 1970s known as the Greyfriars development. The project consisted of large plazas, office blocks and residential towers. The project was not received well and in the 1990s, most of the project was destroyed. Surviving buildings were revamped in the 1980s and 1990s, these included St Francis Court and St Clare House. The rest of the development was demolished to make way for the Willis Building.

21st century
In recent years the town of Ipswich has experienced a building boom, especially on the outskirts such as Ravenswood and Kesgrave. Ipswich dock, known as the waterfront has seen huge investment in two separate projects as part of the waterfront regeneration project. The Cranfield Mill was a development of the tallest building in Ipswich but the interior was never finished due to financial difficulty. The other project was the Regatta Quay redevelopment which consisted of two large residential blocks. The Cambria was completed but The Winerack was never completed as the bank funding the project went bankrupt, the building was left in a skeletal state. As of 2019, construction on The Winerack has started with the completion date set for the end of 2020.

During 2015 another small 'building boom' started, firstly with the redevelopment of Stoke Quay. The development consisted of a large residential building called Stoke Quay Genesis that has 386 homes at a total cost of £36 million. The main contractor was ISG.

Princes Street in the town centre will see the construction of two large office buildings. The old Fisons building is undergoing a £9 million redevelopemt into a newer office building. The construction was expected to be completed in 2016, being built by PDR construction Ltd. The law firm, Birketts LLP is going to build a large HQ on the site of Riley's Pool Hall, which is going to be demolished after their administration announcement. The developers of the plan are Churchmanor Estates.

Tallest Buildings and Structures

An equal sign (=) following a rank indicates the same height between two or more buildings. Only structures taller than 30m are listed.

Timeline of Tallest Buildings

References

Buildings and structures in Ipswich
Ipswich
Lists of buildings and structures in Suffolk